Leikanger is a former municipality in Sogn og Fjordane county, Norway. It was located on the northern shore of the Sognefjorden in the traditional district of Sogn. The administrative center was the village of Hermansverk, which also was the administrative center of the old Sogn og Fjordane county.

The Leikanger/Hermansverk urban area had 2,144 inhabitants (2019), about 90% of the municipal population.  This urban area is often called Systrond, which is why a person from Leikanger is often called Systrending.

The  municipality is the 342nd largest by area out of the 422 municipalities in Norway. Leikanger is the 302nd most populous municipality in Norway with a population of 2,331.

General information

Leikanger was established as a municipality on 1 January 1838 (see formannskapsdistrikt law). The original municipality was large and it was identical to the old Leikanger parish (prestegjeld) with the six sub-parishes of Leikanger, Fresvik, Rinde, Vangsnes, Tjugum, and Mundal. In 1849, the sub-parishes of Vangsnes, Tjugum, and Mundal were transferred into the newly created Balestrand parish (prestegjeld). The new parish was separated from Leikanger municipality in 1850 to form the new Balestrand Municipality. This split left Leikanger with 2,368 residents.

During the 1960s, there were many municipal mergers across Norway due to the work of the Schei Committee. On 1 January 1964, the Hella-Eitorn area (population: 31) was transferred from Balestrand back to Leikanger. Also, the Tingstad area (population: 5) was transferred to neighboring Sogndal municipality. These changes left Leikanger with 2,680 residents. On 1 January 1992, the sub-parishes of Leikanger lying south of the Sognefjorden, including Feios and Fresvik (total population: 572) were transferred to the municipality of Vik. This move left Leikanger with only one sub-parish: Leikanger.

On 1 January 2020, Leikanger was merged with the neighboring municipalities of Balestrand and Sogndal to form a much larger municipality called Sogndal.

Name
The municipality (originally the parish) is named after the old farm Leikanger, since the first Leikanger Church was built there. The first element is leikr which means "sports" or "athletics" and the last element is the plural form of vangr which means "meadow". Prior to 1889, the name was written Lekanger.

Coat of arms
The coat of arms was granted on 5 September 1963. The arms are green with a yellow-colored apple tree branch with two apples and three leaves attached. The apple tree branch is a symbol for the many orchards in the municipality and thus for the local economy. The three leaves symbolised the three parishes that used to make up the municipality (before two of them were transferred to Vik in 1992).

Churches
The Church of Norway had one parish within the municipality of Leikanger. It was part of the Sogn prosti (deanery) in the Diocese of Bjørgvin.

Government
All municipalities in Norway, including Leikanger, are responsible for primary education (through 10th grade), outpatient health services, senior citizen services, unemployment and other social services, zoning, economic development, and municipal roads. The municipality is governed by a municipal council of elected representatives, which in turn elect a mayor.  The municipality falls under the Sogn og Fjordane District Court and the Gulating Court of Appeal.

Municipal council
The municipal council  of Leikanger was made up of 17 representatives that were elected to four year terms. The party breakdown of the final municipal council was as follows:

Mayor
The mayor (ordførar) of a municipality in Norway is a representative of the municipal council who is elected either by the majority of the council. Jon Håkon Odd of the Labour Party was elected mayor for the 2015–2019 term.

Geography
Leikanger is located on the north side of the Sognefjorden and to the east of the Fjærlandsfjorden. It is bordered on the north and east by the municipality of Sogndal, on the west by Balestrand, and on the south (across the Sognefjorden) by Vik.

Buildings and structures
In 1955, the first Sognefjord Span was built near Leikanger. It was the longest span in the world from 1955 until 1997.

Sister cities/Twin towns
Leikanger has sister city agreements with the following places:
  Ribe, Denmark

Notable people 

 Iver Erikssøn Leganger (1629 in Leikanger – 1702) a priest, author and farm owner
 Georg Burchard Jersin (1767 in Leikanger – 1827) a Lutheran minister, rep. on the Norwegian Constitutional Assembly
 Olaf Huseby (1856 in Leikanger – 1942) a Norwegian-American bookseller and publisher
 Jakob Sverdrup (1881 in Leikanger – 1938) a Norwegian philologist and lexicographer
 Kjell Bondevik (1901 in Leikanger – 1983) a Norwegian politician, also wrote history books
 Oddvar Flæte (born 1944 in Leikanger) a politician, County Governor of Sogn og Fjordane 1994-2011 
 Silje Nes (born 1980 in Leikanger) a Norwegian multi-instrumentalist, singer and sound artist
 Elise Thorsnes (born 1988 in Leikanger) a Norwegian footballer, played 125 games with the Norway women's national football team

See also
List of former municipalities of Norway

References

External links

Municipal fact sheet from Statistics Norway 
Official Leikanger municipality website 
NRK: Leikanger 

 
Sogndal
Former municipalities of Norway
1838 establishments in Norway
2020 disestablishments in Norway